The men's two handed javelin throw was a track and field athletics event held as part of the Athletics at the 1912 Summer Olympics programme.  It was the only appearance of the event at the Olympics, along with the other two handed throws.  The format of the event was such that each thrower threw the javelin three times with his right hand and three times with his left hand.  The best distance with each hand was summed to give a total.  The three finalists received three more throws with each hand. NOCs could enter up to 12 athletes.

Results

Saaristo, who had taken the silver medal in the one-handed event, won the two-handed event, leading a Finnish medal sweep. 

The three Finnish throwers qualified for the final, but being assured of medals, they mutually agreed to scratch the final and let the results stand: Olympic officials accepted their request.

References

Sources
 
 

Athletics at the 1912 Summer Olympics
Javelin throw at the Olympics